Gustafer Yellowgold is a fictional character created by Grammy-nominated American songwriter and illustrator, Morgan Taylor. Gustafer is the main character in a series of audio books, hand-drawn music videos brought to life in both live concerts and its DVD/CD series.

In 2018, Audible.com released "I'm From The Sun - The Gustafer Yellowgold Story", a musical audiobook written and narrated by Morgan Taylor with music produced by Patrick Sansone of Wilco and The Autumn Defense. "I'm From The Sun" chronicles Gustafer's early years as a sweet young sunling dealing with the stress of the holidays, bullies, and his family’s raisin business. "I'm From The Sun - The Gustafer Yellowgold Story" was an Audible.com Best Selling Children's Audiobook.

The illustrated music video collection chronicles the exploits of Gustafer, a friendly yellow alien who has come to Earth from the Sun to live out an explorer's life in an anthropomorphized version of the Minnesota woods. The live concerts feature Morgan Taylor performing the songs next to a large video screen containing his moving illustrations.

The property is categorized as children's entertainment, but like Jim Henson's Muppets and Dr. Seuss's work it has adult cross-over appeal, as Taylor's live show has opened for popular alternative music acts such as Wilco and The Polyphonic Spree. The Gustafer Yellowgold Show has performed over 1,500 live concerts since its conception to an ever-growing following across the United States.

Taylor died of sepsis at age 52. Taylor's death was announced on August 12, 2022.

History
The project began in late 2003 as a series of small, illustrated picture books. The illustrations for the books were soon animated and released as a DVD entitled Gustafer Yellowgold's Wide Wild World in Summer 2005 by Apple-Eye Productions, a company started by Taylor and his wife Rachel Loshak. Taylor began performing the concerts that same summer in small venues in New York City's Lower East Side. By 2008, Taylor was listed as "Best Kids' Performer" by New York Magazine. In March 2008 "Gustafer Yellowgold's Mellow Sensation" began its 22-week Off-Broadway run at Daryl Roth's DR2 theater in Manhattan.

Prior to his work on the Gustafer Yellowgold project, Morgan Taylor was a multi-instrumentalist for WILCO members John Stirratt and Pat Sansone's band, The Autumn Defense on their 2004 Circles tour, co-wrote music for Lisa Loeb's 2012 album No Fairy Talesand has had a successful career as a sound and recording engineer working with Joseph Arthur, Jon Brion, Norah Jones, Regina Spektor, Rufus Wainwright, Duncan Sheik, Rich Robinson (Black Crowes) and others.

A native of Dayton, Ohio, Morgan Taylor moved to New York City in 1999, honing his songwriting skills while concurrently becoming a successful sound engineer. A self-taught cartoonist raised on MAD Magazine and Marvel comics, Taylor began drawing what would become the Gustafer Yellowgold videos as a picture book project in winter 2004, during breaks of touring as the multi-instrumentalist for Autumn Defense. Taylor played the first live Gustafer Yellowgold concert with music and moving images in the summer of 2005 while on tour in Seoul, Korea. His DVD/CD sets, Gustafer Yellowgold's Have You Never Been Yellow? and Gustafer Yellowgold's Wide Wild World are NAPPA Gold Award winners and were honored by the Kids First! Film and Video Festival. “Mint Green Bee” from Gustafer Yellowgold's Wide Wild World was a Grand Prize Winner in the John Lennon Songwriting Contest.  The seventh full-length CD/DVD release "Dark Pie Concerns" was nominated for a Grammy award for Best Children's Album in 2015.

Discography
 Gustafer Yellowgold's Wide Wild World (2005) original pressing, now out of print
 Gustafer Yellowgold's Wide Wild World (2007) re-packaged, re-released with additional songs - "A Cooler World" and "Rocket Shoes"
 Gustafer Yellowgold's 'Have You Never Been Yellow'? (2007)
 Gustafer Yellowgold's Mellow Fever (March 17, 2009)
 Gustafer Yellowgold's Infinity Sock (March 1, 2011)
 Gustafer Yellowgold's Year in the Day (April 3, 2012)
 Gustafer Yellowgold's Wisdom Tooth of Wisdom (2014)
 Gustafer Yellowgold's Dark Pie Concerns (2015)
 Gustafer Yellowgold's Brighter Side (2017)
 I'm From The Sun (music from the Audible Original) (2019)

Audio Books

 “I’m From The Sun - The Gustafer Yellowgold Story Part 1” (2018)
 “Minnesota Chronicles - The Gustafer Yellowgold Story Part 2” (2019)
 “A Cooler World - The Gustafer Yellowgold Story Part 3” (2021)

References

Animated characters
Fictional extraterrestrial characters